Lånke was a former municipality in the old Nord-Trøndelag county, Norway. The  municipality existed from 1902 until its dissolution in 1962. The municipality was located south of the Stjørdalselva river in what is now the south-central part of Stjørdal municipality in Trøndelag county. The administrative centre was located in the village of Hell. The famous Hell Station in the village of Hell is situated in the westernmost part of Lånke. There are two churches in Lånke: Lånke Church and Elvran Chapel. Historically, this parish was also known as Leksdal. Lånke is an area dominated by agriculture and forests.

History

The municipality of Laanke was created on 1 January 1902 when the old municipality of Nedre Stjørdal was split into three new municipalities: Laanke (population: 1,449), Stjørdal (population: 3,158), and Skatval (population: 2,125). On 1 January 1914 the small Jøssås area of southwestern Laanke (population: 38) was transferred to the neighboring municipality of Malvik which at that time was in the neighboring county of Sør-Trøndelag.  The spelling of the municipality was later changed to Lånke. During the 1960s, there were many municipal mergers across Norway due to the work of the Schei Committee. On 1 January 1962, the neighboring municipalities of Lånke (population: 1,967), Stjørdal (population: 6,204), Hegra (population: 2,704), and Skatval (population: 1,944) merged to form a new, larger municipality of Stjørdal.

Name
The municipality (originally the parish) is named after the old Laanke farm since the first Lånke Church was built there. The name is derived from the Old Norse word  which means "long", perhaps referring to the long flat area along the river Stjørdalselva. Prior to the 1917 Norwegian language reform law, the name was spelled with the Digraph "aa", and after this reform, the letter å was used instead.

Government
While it existed, this municipality was responsible for primary education (through 10th grade), outpatient health services, senior citizen services, unemployment, social services, zoning, economic development, and municipal roads. During its existence, this municipality was governed by a municipal council of elected representatives, which in turn elected a mayor.

Mayors
The mayors of Lånke:

 1902–1913: Andreas Thyholt (H)
 1914–1922: Torstein Sætnan (H/Bp)
 1923–1928: Olaf Jullum (Bp)
 1929–1937: Lorents Stenvig (Bp)
 1938–1941: Halvard Havdal (Bp)
 1941–1944: Tøllef Elverum (NS)
 1944–1945: Ole O. Elverum (NS)
 1945-1945: Osvald Nordback (NS)
 1945-1945: Halvard Havdal (Bp)
 1946–1951: Johan Hoås (V)
 1952–1955: Oskar Sletne (Ap)
 1956–1957: Iver O. Jullum (Bp)
 1957–1959: Gustav Stuberg (Bp)
 1960–1961: Johan Hoås (V)

Municipal council
The municipal council  of Lånke was made up of 17 representatives that were elected to four year terms. The party breakdown of the final municipal council was as follows:

See also
List of former municipalities of Norway

References

Stjørdal
Former municipalities of Norway
1902 establishments in Norway
1962 disestablishments in Norway